Martha A. Ackelsberg is an American political scientist and women's studies scholar. Her work focuses on the nature of power and its relationship with communities. Cases used in her research include feminist activism in the United States and the Mujeres Libres, an anti-fascist women's organization during the Spanish Revolution of 1936.

Career
Ackelsberg attended Radcliffe College where she earned a BA, and Princeton University where she graduated with an MA and a PhD. Ackelsberg joined the faculty at Smith College in 1972. Ackelsberg was one of the first professors in the Women's studies program at Smith College, which she has been credited with helping to build. Throughout her first several decades as a professor, Ackelsberg was active in Jewish feminist activism with groups like B'not Esh. In 2006, she was appointed the Five College 40th Anniversary Professor at Smith College, and in 2007 she was named the William R. Kenan Jr. Professor. She retired in 2014.

Ackelsberg has written and edited several books. In 1991 she published Free Women of Spain: Anarchism and the Struggle for the Emancipation of Women, which has since been reissued. The book is a history of the Mujeres Libres (Free Women), a women's organization during the Spanish Revolution of 1936 that distinguished itself from other anti-fascist groups by seeking a broad emancipation of women in Spanish society.

Ackelsberg also wrote the 2010 book Resisting Citizenship: Feminist Essays on Politics, Community, and Democracy. This collection of essays studies the connection between community and power, using the United States as a case study to investigate this connection in the context of democratic theory. The essays particularly focus on power as obtained and expressed by feminist activists among their lager communities.

Together with Kristen Renwick Monroe and Rogers M. Smith, Ackelsberg received the 2010 Frank Johnson Goodnow Award from the American Political Science Association, a lifetime award that "honors service to the community of teachers, researchers, and public servants who work in the many fields of politics."

Ackelsberg's work has been covered in media outlets like Nexo (pt) and The Jewish Voice, and she has written for Gotham Gazette. Her partner is Judith Plaskow, professor emerita of religious studies at Manhattan College.

Selected works
Women, Welfare, and Higher Education: Toward Comprehensive Policies, edited, with Randall Bartlett and Robert Buchele (1988)
Free Women of Spain: Anarchism and the Struggle for the Emancipation of Women (1991)
Resisting Citizenship: Feminist Essays on Politics, Community, and Democracy (2010)

Selected awards
Frank Johnson Goodnow Award, American Political Science Association (2010)

References

External links 

 Martha Ackelsberg papers at the Sophia Smith Collection, Smith College Special Collections
 Martha Ackelsberg papers at the Smith College Archives, Smith College Special Collections

American women academics
20th-century American women writers
21st-century American women writers
Living people
Radcliffe College alumni
Princeton University alumni
Smith College faculty
Jewish women writers
American lesbian writers
Jewish American writers
Year of birth missing (living people)
American women political scientists
American political scientists
21st-century American Jews